is a member of the Japanese Communist Party serving in the House of Representatives as a representative of the Tokyo proportional representation block, a position to which he was elected to in 2014. Miyamoto is opposed to increasing the budget for the Ministry of Defense. He is also opposed to preemptively striking North Korea, thinking that the Prime Minister of Japan Shinzo Abe should put pressure on the United States to not attack North Korea, saying the number of lives that would be lost would be enormous.

References

1972 births
Living people
Japanese Communist Party politicians
Members of the House of Representatives (Japan)
Politicians from Hyōgo Prefecture